Lyubov Viktorovna Burda (born 11 April 1953) is a retired Soviet artistic gymnast.

Career

In 1967 Burda placed 3rd in the all-around at the USSR Championships (also the USSR Spartakiade that year) as well as placing 2nd on balance beam and floor exercise. At the end of the year, Burda won the junior all-around competition at the USSR Cup as well as winning gold medals in the balance beam and floor exercise finals, which combined junior and senior gymnasts. In 1968 Burda placed 5th in the all-around and 4th in the team competition at the USSR Championships. In July of that year, Burda placed 2nd in the all-around at the USSR Cup.

In 1969 Burda won the gold medal in the all-around at the USSR Championships. At the USSR Cup, Burda placed 2nd in the all-around and 1st on uneven bars.  In 1970 Burda won her second all-around title at the USSR Championships as well as a bronze medal with her team. That Summer, Burda won the gold medal at the USSR Cup, as well as a bronze medal on vault. Burda was a member of the Soviet team that won the gold medal at the 1970 World Championships. Individually, she won a bronze medal on vault, shared with teammate Ludmilla Tourischeva. She also placed 5th in the all-around, 4th on uneven bars and 6th on floor exercise. In 1971 Burda won the silver medal in the all-around at the USSR Cup. In 1972 Burda placed 4th in the all-around at the USSR Cup as well as winning silver medals on vault and floor exercise.

Burda was a member of the Soviet team that won the gold medal at the 1970 World Championships. Individually, she won a bronze medal on vault, shared with teammate Ludmilla Tourischeva. In 1972 Burda placed 5th in the all-around at USSR Championships as well as winning silver medals on vault and floor exercise and placing 4th on balance beam and 6th with the team. Individually she had her best international results at the 1972 Olympics, when she placed fifth in the all-around competition, fourth in the vault, and tied for fifth place on the floor.

In 1973 Burda placed 5th in the all-around at the USSR Championships.

Eponymous skill
Burda has one eponymous skill listed in the Code of Points.

Post-retirement
She was inducted into the International Gymnastics Hall of Fame in 2001. She was married to Nikolai Andrianov until their divorce in the early 2000s.

Competitive history

References

1953 births
Living people
Soviet female artistic gymnasts
Sportspeople from Voronezh
Olympic gymnasts of the Soviet Union
Gymnasts at the 1968 Summer Olympics
Gymnasts at the 1972 Summer Olympics
Olympic gold medalists for the Soviet Union
Olympic medalists in gymnastics
Medalists at the 1972 Summer Olympics
Medalists at the 1968 Summer Olympics
Medalists at the World Artistic Gymnastics Championships
Universiade medalists in gymnastics
Universiade silver medalists for the Soviet Union
Universiade bronze medalists for the Soviet Union
Medalists at the 1973 Summer Universiade